KTHC (95.1 FM) is a radio station licensed to Sidney, Montana, and serving northeast Montana and northwest North Dakota including the cities of Sidney, Montana and Williston, North Dakota. The station, also known as "Power 95.1," has a 24-hour Top 40 (CHR) format.

It also has two sister stations, KEYZ and KYYZ. All three stations are owned by Townsquare Media, and are located at 410 6th Street East, on Williston's east side.

External links

THC
THC
Contemporary hit radio stations in the United States
Townsquare Media radio stations